Stand up for us is the policy to combat homophobia in UK junior and secondary schools, published jointly by the Department for Children, Schools and Families and the Department of Health. Schools which implement the policy are helping to meet requirements of the Children Act 2004 which aims to improve every child's:

(a) physical and mental health and emotional well-being

(b) protection from harm and neglect

(c) education, training and recreation

(d) contribution made to society

(e) social and economic well-being

These are the five outcomes for children identified in the green paper upon which the Act is based.

Stand up for us was first announced as part of anti-bullying week in November 2004.

References

External links
 Stand up for us SUFU pdf file
 Anti-Bullying Alliance (ABA)
 Educational Action Challenging Homophobia (EACH)

Education in the United Kingdom
Anti-homophobia
LGBT law in the United Kingdom
LGBT youth
School bullying
Education policy in the United Kingdom
Department for Children, Schools and Families
Department of Health and Social Care